Lancia Florida is the name of two studies based on the Lancia Aurelia, which were built by Lancia in collaboration with Pinin Farina. Both were made in extremely small numbers. They are both considered to be masterpieces of Italian automotive design and had a lot of influence on automotive design. From them were later derived the sedan and the coupe versions of the Lancia Flaminia.

Florida I 

The Florida I was built in 1955, with the first car, a coupe, being completed in September of that year. It was first shown at that year's Turin Auto Show. The Florida I is mostly known for the 4-door Berlina model, but a coupe model was also made; It was one of the first cars to carry the Lancia logo. The sedan has rear suicide doors, according to Lancia tradition, and no B pillar, as well as many interesting design elements such as flat sides with a single crease running right above the wheelwell, headlights mounted in the grille, an inset rear windshield and flying buttresses. A total of 4 cars were built, 3 of which were 4-door Berlinas and one of which was a 2-door coupe.

For the production of the first prototype at Pinin Farina 10 of 340 employees of the company were employed (presumably under the direction of Francesco Martinengo). On April 2, 1955, Antonio Fessia became the new technical director of Lancia, initiating further changes to the car. The V6 engine was a development of Francesco de Virgilio. The Florida initially had a conventional rigid DeDion rear axle.

.

Florida II 

The Florida II concept, introduced in 1957, is a two-door coupe with pillarless windows on the doors, meaning it does not have a B pillar. Its V6 engine displaces 2,266 cm 3 and makes 87 hp (64 kW) at 4,800 rpm. 

The Florida II was a personal favorite of Pinin Farina founder, Battista Farina and he regularly used it until his death in April 1966. He also said about it that it was "the only one to go to heaven".

The production version of the Lancia Flaminia Coupe was similar to the Florida II, sharing many of its key design elements, but had a B-pillar and was significantly shorter. The Flaminia coupe also adopted a steeper windshield rake, framed door glass, door vent windows, and a bigger air scoop at the request of Lancia. The Florida II is regarded as a very important design, with many saying its angular styling helped pave the way for 1960s car design as a whole. Mercedes designer Bruno Sacco once described the Florida II as one of the cars he would have liked to design. The principles of the suicide doors and the lack of a B-pillar were used again in the Lancia Dialogos study in 1997.

References 

Florida
Pininfarina vehicles